Rob Schneiderman may refer to:

 Rob Schneiderman (mathematician) (born 1957), American mathematician
 Rob Schneiderman (politician) (born 1967), American politician